Calocomus is a genus of longhorn beetles in the family Cerambycidae, containing the following species:

 Calocomus desmaresti (Guérin-Méneville, 1831)
 Calocomus kreuchelyi Buquet 1840
 Calocomus morosus White, 1850
 Calocomus rodingeri Tippmann, 1951
 Calocomus rugosipennis Lucas, 1857

References

Prioninae